Edward Burton Hodges (May 25, 1917 – January 8, 2001) was a Major League Baseball third baseman. Listed at 5' 11", 170 lb., he batted left-handed and threw right-handed.

Born in Knoxville, Tennessee, Hodges started his minor league career in 1937 with the Elizabethton Betsy Red Sox, playing for them three years before joining the Greenville Buckshots (1940) and the Memphis Chickasaws (1941). He entered the major leagues in 1942 with the Philadelphia Phillies, appearing in eight games from April 14 to 26.

Hodges had two singles in eleven at bats for a .182 average, but did not score a run or drive one in.

He returned to Memphis in 1942 and played one more season with them in 1947. In 797 minor league games, he hit .292 with 234 extra-base hits, including 23 home runs.

Hodges died in Knoxville, Tennessee, at the age of 83.

Sources

External links

Major League Baseball third basemen
Philadelphia Phillies players
Elizabethton Betsy Red Sox players
Greenville Buckshots players
Memphis Chickasaws players
Baseball players from Knoxville, Tennessee
1917 births
2001 deaths